New Scientist is a magazine covering all aspects of science and technology. Based in London, it publishes weekly English-language editions in the United Kingdom, the United States and Australia. An editorially separate organisation publishes a monthly Dutch-language edition. First published on 22 November 1956, New Scientist has been available in online form since 1996.

Sold in retail outlets (paper edition) and on subscription (paper and/or online), the magazine covers news, features, reviews and commentary on science, technology and their implications. New Scientist also publishes speculative articles, ranging from the technical to the philosophical.

New Scientist was acquired by Daily Mail and General Trust (DMGT) in March 2021.

History

Ownership
The magazine was founded in 1956 by Tom Margerison, Max Raison and Nicholas Harrison as The New Scientist, with Issue 1 on 22 November 1956, priced at one shilling (a twentieth of a pound in pre-decimal UK currency). An article in the magazine's 10th anniversary issues provides anecdotes on the founding of the magazine. The British monthly science magazine Science Journal, published from 1965 until 1971, was merged with New Scientist to form New Scientist and Science Journal. In 1970, the Reed Group, which became Reed Elsevier, acquired New Scientist when it merged with IPC Magazines. Reed retained the magazine when it sold most of its consumer titles in a management buyout to what is now TI Media. In April 2017 New Scientist changed ownership when RELX Group, formerly known as Reed Elsevier, sold the magazine to Kingston Acquisitions, a group established by Sir Bernard Gray, Louise Rogers and Matthew O’Sullivan to acquire New Scientist. Kingston Acquisitions then renamed itself New Scientist Ltd. The New Scientist was subsequently sold to the Daily Mail and General Trust (DMGT) for £70 million in March 2021; DMGT guaranteed the magazine's editorial independence, and ruled out staff cuts and the sharing of editorial content.

In December 2021, DMGT announced that both New Scientist and the DMGT-owned daily i newspaper would be moved to a new division of the company, to be called Harmsworth Media.

General history
Originally, the cover of New Scientist listed articles in plain text. Initially, page numbering followed academic practice with sequential numbering for each quarterly volume. So, for example, the first page of an issue in March could be 649 instead of 1. Later issues numbered issues separately. From the beginning of 1961 "The" was dropped from the title. From 1965, the front cover was illustrated. Until the 1970s, colour was not used except on the cover.

Since its first issue, New Scientist has written about the applications of science, through its coverage of technology. For example, the first issue included an article "Where next from Calder Hall?" on the future of nuclear power in the UK, a topic that it has covered throughout its history. In 1964, there was a regular "Science in British Industry" section with several items.

Throughout most of its history, New Scientist has published cartoons as light relief and comment on the news, with contributions from regulars such as Mike Peyton and David Austin. The Grimbledon Down comic strip, by cartoonist Bill Tidy, appeared from 1970 to 1994. The Ariadne pages in New Scientist commented on the lighter side of science and technology and included contributions from David E. H. Jones, Daedalus. The fictitious inventor devised plausible but impractical and humorous inventions, often developed by the (fictitious) DREADCO corporation. Daedalus later moved to Nature.

Issues of (The) New Scientist from issue 1 to the end of 1989 are free to read online; subsequent issues require a subscription.

In the first half of 2013, the international circulation of New Scientist averaged 125,172. While this was a 4.3% reduction on the previous year's figure, it was a much smaller reduction in circulation than many mainstream magazines of similar or greater circulation. UK circulation fell by 3.2% in 2014, but stronger international sales increased the circulation to 129,585.

A monthly Dutch edition of New Scientist was launched in June 2015. It replaced the former  (NWT) magazine, adopting its staff and subscribers. The editorially independent magazine is published by Veen Media. It contains mainly translations of articles in the English-language edition, but also its own articles. These are typically focused on research in the Netherlands and Belgium, the main countries where it is purchased.

Modern format
In the 21st century, until May 2019, New Scientist contained the following sections: Leader, News (Upfront), Technology, Opinion (interviews, point-of-view articles and letters), Features (including cover article), CultureLab (book and event reviews), Feedback (humour), The Last Word (questions and answers) and Jobs & Careers. A Tom Gauld cartoon appears on the Letters page. A readers' letters section discusses recent articles and discussions also take place on the website. Readers contribute observations on examples of pseudoscience to Feedback, and offer questions and answers on scientific and technical topics to Last Word. New Scientist has produced a series of books compiled from contributions to Last Word.

From issue 3228 of 4 May 2019, New Scientist introduced a "slightly updated design, with ... a fresher, brighter feel". A dedicated "Views" section was added between news reports and in-depth features, including readers' letters, comment, and reviews on science, culture and society. Regular columnists were introduced, and columns in the culture pages. The light-hearted "Back Pages" includes the long-standing Feedback and The Last Word, puzzles, and a Q&A section.

Online readership takes various forms. Overall global views of an online database of over 100,000 articles are 10.8m by 7m unique users according to Google Analytics, . On social media there are 3.5m+ Twitter followers, 3.5m+ Facebook followers and 100,000+ Instagram followers .

Staff and contributors
Emily Wilson was appointed editor-in-chief in 2018. Current staff members are listed on page 5 of the magazine. Columnists  included Annalee Newitz on novel tech. James Wong on food myths, Chanda Prescod-Weinstein's adventures in space-time and Graham Lawton on environment.

Editors of New Scientist
Percy Cudlipp (1956–1962)
Nigel Calder (1962–1966)
Donald Gould (1966–1969)
Bernard Dixon (1969–1979)
Michael Kenward (1979–1990)
David Dickson (1990–1992)
Alun Anderson (1992–2000)
Jeremy Webb (2000–2008)
Roger Highfield (2008–2011)
Sumit Paul-Choudhury (2011–2018)
Emily Wilson (2018–)

Spin-offs
New Scientist has published books derived from its content, many of which are selected questions and answers from the "Last Word" section of the magazine and website:
 1998. The Last Word. 
 2000. The Last Word 2. 
 2005. Does Anything Eat Wasps?. 
 2006. Why Don't Penguins' Feet Freeze?. (selections from the first two books) 
 2007. How to Fossilise Your Hamster. 
 2008. Do Polar Bears Get Lonely?. 
 2009. How to Make a Tornado: The strange and wonderful things that happen when scientists break free. 
 2010. Why Can't Elephants Jump?. 
 2011. Why Are Orangutans Orange?: science questions in picture. 
 2012. Will We Ever Speak Dolphin?. 
 2014. Question Everything. 

Other books published by New Scientist include:
 The Anti Zoo – 50 freaks of nature you won't see on TV (e-book based on the website's "Zoologger" column)
 Nothing: Surprising insights everywhere from zero to oblivion. (compilation of articles previously published in the magazine) 
 New Scientist: The Collection (compendiums of articles on specific scientific topics)
Volume 1 (2014, 4 issues):
The Big Questions
The Unknown Universe
Guide to a Better You
The Human Story
Volume 2 (2015, 5 issues):
The Human Brain
Medical Frontiers
Being Human
Our Planet
15 Ideas you Need to Understand
Volume 3 (2016, 5 issues):
The Wonders of Space
Life: Origin, Evolution, Extinction
The Quantum World
Wild Planet
Mind-Expanding Ideas
Volume 4 (2017, 4 issues):
Einstein's Mind-Bending Universe
The Scientific Guide to an Even Better You
Essential Knowledge
Infinity and Beyond
Second Edition (2018-2019):
Big Questions Big Answers (2nd Edition of "The Big Questions")
21 Great Mysteries of the Universe (2nd Edition of "The Unknown Universe")
Civilisation
Becoming Human (2nd Edition of "The Human Story")
The Essential Guide to Earth (2nd Edition of "Our Planet")
Souvenir Issue: The Quest for Space
Being Human
17 More Things You Need to Understand
Mysteries of the Human Brain
New Scientist: Essential Guides (2020-2023)
The Nature of Reality
Artificial Intelligence
Human Health
Our Human Story
Quantum Physics
Evolution
The Human Brain
Climate Change
Nutrition and Diet
Einstein's Universe
Life on Earth
Consciousness
The Solar System
Human Society
Particle Physics
Exercise

New Scientist has also worked with other publishers to produce books based on the magazine's content:

 1992 Inside Science, edited by Richard Fifield, published by Penguin Books. 
 1992 The New Scientist Guide to Chaos, edited by Nina Hall, published by Penguin Books. 

In 2012 Arc, "a new digital quarterly from the makers of New Scientist, exploring the future through the world of science fiction" and fact was launched. In the same year the magazine launched a dating service, NewScientistConnect, operated by The Dating Lab.

Since 2016 New Scientist has held an annual science festival in London. Styled New Scientist Live, the event has attracted high-profile scientists and science presenters.

Criticism

Greg Egan's criticism of the EmDrive article 
In September 2006, New Scientist was criticised by science fiction writer Greg Egan, who wrote that "a sensationalist bent and a lack of basic knowledge by its writers" was making the magazine's coverage sufficiently unreliable "to constitute a real threat to the public understanding of science". In particular, Egan found himself "gobsmacked by the level of scientific illiteracy" in the magazine's coverage of Roger Shawyer's "electromagnetic drive", where New Scientist allowed the publication of "meaningless double-talk" designed to bypass a fatal objection to Shawyer's proposed space drive, namely that it violates the law of conservation of momentum. Egan urged others to write to New Scientist and pressure the magazine to raise its standards, instead of "squandering the opportunity that the magazine's circulation and prestige provides". The editor of New Scientist, then Jeremy Webb, replied defending the article, saying that it is "an ideas magazine—that means writing about hypotheses as well as theories".

"Darwin was wrong" cover 
In January 2009, New Scientist ran a cover with the title "Darwin was wrong". The actual story stated that specific details of Darwin's evolution theory had been shown incorrectly, mainly the shape of phylogenetic trees of interrelated species, which should be represented as a web instead of a tree. Some evolutionary biologists who actively oppose the intelligent design movement thought the cover was both sensationalist and damaging to the scientific community.

See also 

 Citizen science – first use of this term was in New Scientist in October 1979
 List of scientific journals
 Nominative determinism – first use of this term was in New Scientist in December 1994

References

External links
 
 Digitized New Scientist magazines on Google Books

1956 establishments in the United Kingdom
2017 mergers and acquisitions
2021 mergers and acquisitions
Daily Mail and General Trust
Magazines established in 1956
Magazines published in London
Popular science magazines
Science and technology in the United Kingdom
Science and technology magazines published in the United Kingdom
Weekly magazines published in the United Kingdom